Carlos L. Arteaga is the Associate Director for Clinical Research, director of the Center for Cancer Targeted Therapies, and professor of Cancer Biology and Medicine at Vanderbilt-Ingram Cancer Center. In 2014–2015, he was the president of the American Association for Cancer Research.

Arteaga graduated with his MD from the Universidad de Guayaquil in Ecuador in 1980, where his father was the dean of medicine. He came to the United States intending to specialize in cardiology after his internal medicine residency at Emory University, but changed course and instead did a fellowship in hematology-oncology at University of Texas Health Science Center.

Arteaga joined the faculty at Vanderbilt in 1989 and since 2002, has directed the NCI-funded Vanderbilt Breast Cancer Specialized Program of Research Excellence (SPORE).

Research 
Arteaga is recognized as an expert in the field of breast cancer research. He has demonstrated the utility of targeting TGF-β, which causes cancer to spread, metastasize, and become resistant to chemotherapeutic drugs. He was involved in the development of trastuzumab in combination with chemotherapy for patients with HER2-mutated cancer. Among his current research areas is triple-negative breast cancer, for which there are no targeted therapy options.

He is a principal investigator for the Stand Up To Cancer (SU2C) "Targeting the PI3K Pathway in Women's Cancers" Dream Team, which provides $15 million is research funding for a research team spread across 7 institutions.

Awards 
 2015  Prize for Scientific Excellence in Medicine, American-Italian Cancer Foundation
 2014  President, American Association for Cancer Research
 2014  Grant W. Liddle Award, Vanderbilt University
 2013  Elected Fellow, American Association for the Advancement of Science
 2011  Brinker Award for Scientific Distinction in Basic Science, Susan G. Komen Foundation
 2009  Gianni Bonadonna Award, American Society of Clinical Oncology
 2005  Elected Member, Association of American Physicians
 2004–2007  Board of Directors, AACR
 2003  AACR-Richard & Hinda Rosenthal Award
 1998  Elected Member, American Society for Clinical Investigation
 1995–2000  Clinical Investigator Award, U.S. Department of Veteran Affairs

References 

Year of birth missing (living people)
Living people
Ecuadorian scientists
Fellows of the AACR Academy
Cancer researchers